Jorge Vizcarrondo Somohano (born 7 May 1948) is a Puerto Rican sprinter. He competed in the 100 metres at the 1968 Summer Olympics and the 1972 Summer Olympics.

References

1948 births
Living people
Athletes (track and field) at the 1967 Pan American Games
Athletes (track and field) at the 1968 Summer Olympics
Athletes (track and field) at the 1971 Pan American Games
Athletes (track and field) at the 1972 Summer Olympics
People from Cidra, Puerto Rico
Puerto Rican male sprinters
Olympic track and field athletes of Puerto Rico
Central American and Caribbean Games medalists in athletics
Pan American Games competitors for Puerto Rico